New Americans is a 1944 American short documentary film directed by Slavko Vorkapić. It was part of RKO Pictures's This Is America series and featured the National Refugee Service. It was nominated for an Academy Award for Best Documentary Short.

References

External links

1944 films
1940s short documentary films
Black-and-white documentary films
American short documentary films
American black-and-white films
RKO Pictures short films
Films directed by Slavko Vorkapić
1944 documentary films
1940s English-language films
1940s American films